Anthony Carew (born 1889) was an Irish hurler who played for the Tipperary senior team.

Carew joined the team during the 1908 championship and was a regular member of the starting fifteen until his retirement after the 1912 championship. During that time he won one All-Ireland medal and two Munster medals.

At club level Gleeson enjoyed a lengthy career with Thurles Sarsfield's and Clonoulty–Rossmore.

References

1889 births
Clonoulty-Rossmore hurlers
Thurles Sarsfields hurlers
Tipperary inter-county hurlers
All-Ireland Senior Hurling Championship winners
Year of death missing